Thomas Jeffrey ("Jeff") Goodwin (22 January 1929 – 15 February 2006) was an English cricketer active from 1950 to 1959 who played for Leicestershire. He was born in Bignall End, Staffordshire. He appeared in 136 first-class matches as a lefthanded batsman who bowled left arm fast medium. He scored 474 runs with a highest score of 23* and took 335 wickets with a best performance of eight for 81.

Notes

1929 births
2006 deaths
English cricketers
Leicestershire cricketers